Attorney General Cullen may refer to:

Michael Cullen (politician) (born 1945), Attorney General of New Zealand
Richard Cullen (attorney) (born 1948), Attorney General of Virginia

See also
General Cullen (disambiguation)